Hazenmore is a village in the Canadian province of Saskatchewan within the Rural Municipality of Pinto Creek No. 75 and Census Division No. 3.

History 
Hazenmore incorporated as a village on August 20, 1913.

Demographics 

Infrastructure

Saskatchewan Transportation Company once provided intercity bus service to Hazenmore, but the publicly owned and subsidized provincial bus service known as the Saskatchewan Transit Corporation or STC shut down in 2017.

See also 

 List of communities in Saskatchewan
 Villages of Saskatchewan

References

Villages in Saskatchewan
Pinto Creek No. 75, Saskatchewan
Division No. 3, Saskatchewan